Krystian Czernichowski (6 February 1930 – 13 November 2014) was a Polish basketball player. He competed in the men's tournament at the 1964 Summer Olympics.

References

1930 births
2014 deaths
Polish men's basketball players
Olympic basketball players of Poland
Basketball players at the 1964 Summer Olympics
Sportspeople from Lviv
People from Lwów Voivodeship